The Gutenko Nunataks are small, elongated nunataks  west of Mount Morgan in the Ford Ranges of Marie Byrd Land, Antarctica. They were discovered on aerial flights made from the West Base of the United States Antarctic Service in 1940, and named for Sigmund Gutenko, a cook and steward at West Base.

References

Nunataks of Marie Byrd Land